The 2023–24 UEFA Europa League will be the 53rd season of Europe's secondary club football tournament organised by UEFA, and the 15th season since it was renamed from the UEFA Cup to the UEFA Europa League.

The final will be played at the Aviva Stadium in Dublin, Republic of Ireland. The winners of the tournament will automatically qualify for the 2024–25 UEFA Champions League group stage, and also earn the right to play against the winners of the 2023–24 UEFA Champions League in the 2024 UEFA Super Cup.

This edition will be the final season with the current format of 32 teams participating at the group stage, after UEFA announced that a brand new format would be introduced for the following edition.

Association team allocation
A total of 58 teams from between 31 and 36 of the 55 UEFA member associations are expected to participate in the 2023–24 UEFA Europa League. Among them, 15 associations have teams directly qualifying for the Europa League, while for the other 40 associations that do not have any teams directly qualifying, between 15 and 20 of them may have teams playing after being transferred from the Champions League (the only member association which cannot have a participant is Liechtenstein, which does not organise a domestic league, and can only enter their cup winner into the Europa Conference League given their association ranking). The association ranking based on the UEFA country coefficients is used to determine the number of participating teams for each association:
The title holders of the UEFA Europa Conference League will be given an entry in the Europa League (if they do not qualify to the Champions League through league performance).
Associations 1–5 each have two teams qualify.
Associations 6–16 (except Russia) each have one team qualify.
37 teams eliminated from the 2022–23 UEFA Champions League are transferred to the Europa League.

Association ranking
For the 2023–24 UEFA Europa League, the associations are allocated places according to their 2022 UEFA country coefficients, which takes into account their performance in European competitions from 2017–18 to 2021–22.

Apart from the allocation based on the country coefficients, associations may have additional teams participating in the Europa League, as noted below:
 – Additional teams transferred from the UEFA Champions League

Distribution
The following is the access list for this season.

Due to the suspension of Russia for the 2023–24 European season, the following changes to the access list have been made:

 The cup winners of associations 13 (Belgium) and 14 (Switzerland) enter the play-off round instead of the third qualifying round.
 The cup winners of association 16 (Czech Republic) enter the third qualifying round instead of the Europa Conference League second qualifying round.

Teams

The labels in the parentheses show how each team qualified for the place of its starting round:
CW: Cup winners
4th, 5th, etc.: League position of the previous season

UCL: Transferred from the Champions League
GS: Third-placed teams from the group stage
CH/LP PO: Losers from the play-off round (Champions/League Path)
CH/LP Q3: Losers from the third qualifying round (Champions/League Path)
CH/LP Q2: Losers from the second qualifying round (Champions/League Path)

The third qualifying round is divided into Champions Path (CH) and Main Path (MP).

Notes

Schedule
The schedule of the competition is as follows. Matches are scheduled for Thursdays apart from the final, which takes place on a Wednesday, though exceptionally can take place on Tuesdays or Wednesdays due to scheduling conflicts.

See also
2023–24 UEFA Champions League
2023–24 UEFA Europa Conference League
2024 UEFA Super Cup
2023–24 UEFA Women's Champions League
2023–24 UEFA Youth League

References

External links

 
1
2023-24
Scheduled association football competitions